In number theory, Cramér's conjecture, formulated by the Swedish mathematician Harald Cramér in 1936, is an estimate for the size of gaps between consecutive prime numbers: intuitively, that gaps between consecutive primes are always small, and the conjecture quantifies asymptotically just how small they must be.  It states that

where pn denotes the nth prime number, O is big O notation, and "log" is the natural logarithm. While this is the statement explicitly conjectured by Cramér, his heuristic actually supports the stronger statement

and sometimes this formulation is called Cramér's conjecture. However, this stronger version is not supported by more accurate heuristic models, which nevertheless support the first version of Cramér's conjecture. Neither form has yet been proven or disproven.

Conditional proven results on prime gaps
Cramér gave a conditional proof of the much weaker statement that

on the assumption of the Riemann hypothesis. The best known unconditional bound is

due to Baker, Harman, and Pintz.

In the other direction, E. Westzynthius proved in 1931 that prime gaps grow more than logarithmically. That is,

His result was improved by R. A. Rankin, who proved that

Paul Erdős conjectured that the left-hand side of the above formula is infinite, and this was proven in 2014 by Kevin Ford, Ben Green, Sergei Konyagin, and Terence Tao.

Heuristic justification
Cramér's conjecture is based on a probabilistic model—essentially a heuristic—in which the probability that a number of size x is prime is 1/log x. This is known as the Cramér random model or Cramér model of the primes.

In the Cramér random model,

with probability one. However, as pointed out by Andrew Granville, Maier's theorem shows that the Cramér random model does not adequately describe the distribution of primes on short intervals, and a refinement of Cramér's model taking into account divisibility by small primes suggests that , where  is the Euler–Mascheroni constant. János Pintz has suggested that the limit sup may be infinite, and similarly Leonard Adleman and Kevin McCurley write

Similarly, Robin Visser writes
In fact, due to the work done by Granville, it is now widely believed that Cramér's conjecture is false. Indeed, there some theorems concerning short intervals between primes, such as Maier's theorem, which contradict Cramér's model.
(internal references removed).

Related conjectures and heuristics

Daniel Shanks conjectured the following asymptotic equality, stronger than Cramér's conjecture, for record gaps:

J.H. Cadwell has proposed the formula for the maximal gaps:

which is formally identical to the Shanks conjecture but suggests a lower-order term.

Marek Wolf has proposed the formula for the maximal gaps 
expressed in terms of the prime-counting function
:

This is again formally equivalent to the Shanks conjecture but suggests lower-order terms
.

Thomas Nicely has calculated many large prime gaps. He measures the quality of fit to Cramér's conjecture by measuring the ratio

He writes, "For the largest known maximal gaps,  has remained near 1.13."

See also
Prime number theorem
Legendre's conjecture and Andrica's conjecture, much weaker but still unproven upper bounds on prime gaps
Firoozbakht's conjecture
Maier's theorem on the numbers of primes in short intervals for which the model predicts an incorrect answer

References

External links

Analytic number theory
Conjectures about prime numbers
Unsolved problems in number theory